The Sauber C2 was the second prototype racing car that Swiss Peter Sauber designed and developed. It was built in 1971. It scored three race wins and seven podium finishes. It was also very light, weighing only .

References

Rear-wheel-drive vehicles
Mid-engined cars
Sports prototypes
Cars introduced in 1971
Cars of Switzerland
Sauber Motorsport